Cleveland is a city in White County, Georgia, located  northeast of Atlanta and  southeast of Chattanooga, Tennessee. Its population was 3,410 at the 2010 census (up from 1,907 in 2000). It is the county seat of White County.

Cleveland is home to the North Georgia Zoo and Petting Farm, Farmhouse Coffee, and Babyland General Hospital, the “birthplace” of Cabbage Patch Kids dolls, as well as an adoption center for the dolls.

History
Cleveland was founded in 1857 as the seat of newly formed White County. It was incorporated as a town in 1870 and as a city in 1949. It was named for General Benjamin Cleveland, a War of 1812 figure and grandson of Colonel Benjamin Cleveland, a Revolutionary War figure.

Geography
Cleveland is located at  (34.596309, -83.763893).

Climate

Demographics

At the 2010 census, the population was 3,410.

As of the census of 2000, there were 1,907 people, 729 households, and 468 families residing in the city. The racial makeup of the city was 86.58% White, 10.70% African American, 0.26% Native American, 0.31% Asian, 0.05% Pacific Islander, 0.73% from other races, and 1.36% from two or more races. Hispanic or Latino of any race were 1.99% of the population.

There were 729 households, out of which 27.6% had children under the age of 18 living with them, 43.5% were married couples living together, 17.3% had a female householder with no husband present, and 35.8% were non-families. 31.6% of all households were made up of individuals, and 15.0% had someone living alone who was 65 years of age or older. The average household size was 2.29 and the average family size was 2.84.

In the city, the population was spread out, with 19.9% under the age of 18, 21.8% from 18 to 24, 22.4% from 25 to 44, 20.0% from 45 to 64, and 15.9% who were 65 years of age or older. The median age was 32 years. For every 100 females, there were 85.1 males. For every 100 females age 18 and over, there were 79.2 males.

The median income for a household in the city was $31,949, and the median income for a family was $37,417. Males had a median income of $27,500 versus $21,676 for females. The per capita income for the city was $14,801. About 12.4% of families and 15.5% of the population were below the poverty line, including 25.6% of those under age 18 and 11.4% of those age 65 or over.

Education

White County School District 
The White County School District holds pre-school to grade twelve, and consists of four elementary schools, a middle school, and a high school. The district has 233 full-time teachers and over 3,758 students.

Truett McConnell University
Truett McConnell University is a private, Christian, coeducational liberal arts college in Cleveland. It is affiliated with the Georgia Baptist Convention, and controlled by a Board of Trustees elected by the Convention. The college was named to honor George W. Truett and Fernando C. McConnell.

Culture
The town is home to two Jewish summer camps, Camp Barney Medintz (under the auspices of the Marcus Jewish Community Center of Atlanta) and URJ Camp Coleman (under the auspices of the Union for Reform Judaism).

The town is also home to two Christian summer camps, Strong Rock Camp and Retreat and Woodlands Camp.

Travelers pass through the town on their way to other destinations just a few miles away, such as the Bavarian-themed town of Helen, Unicoi State Park, the Smithgall Woods-Dukes Creek Conservation Area, and the Chattahoochee National Forest, including Anna Ruby Falls.

Notable people
Alton Brown, Food Network personality
Billy Lothridge, NFL player
Xavier Roberts, creator of Cabbage Patch Kids

References

{{|date=March 15, 2022 }}
Cities in Georgia (U.S. state)
Cities in White County, Georgia
County seats in Georgia (U.S. state)